"Somebody Bigger Than You and I" is a song written by Johnny Lange, Hy Heath and Sonny Burke. It is known as a gospel standard.

Notable recordings 
 Mahalia Jackson – I Believe (1960)
 Elvis Presley – How Great Thou Art (1967)
 Dionne Warwick – Magic of Believing (1968)
 Whitney Houston featuring Bobby Brown, Faith Evans, Johnny Gill, Monica and Ralph Tresvant – The Preacher's Wife: Original Soundtrack Album (1996)
 Marion Williams
 The Caravans featuring Josephine Howard)
 Dorothy Love Coates & The Original Gospel Harmonettes featuring Cleopatra Kennedy
 Marco T.  Great Spanish version in 2003

References

Gospel songs
Songs with music by Sonny Burke
Songs written by Hy Heath
Songs written by Johnny Lange
Year of song missing